is a Japanese manga series written by Yabako Sandrovich and illustrated by MAAM. It has been serialized via Shogakukan's Ura Sunday website and MangaONE app since August 2016 and has been collected into seventeen tankōbon volumes as of December 2022. The manga is licensed in North America by Seven Seas Entertainment. A twelve-episode anime television series adaptation by Doga Kobo aired from July to September 2019.

Plot
Hibiki Sakura is a second-year high school girl who has a voracious appetite; this habit leads to her gaining weight. Once this is brought to her attention, she reluctantly thinks about joining the Silverman Gym. At the gym, Hibiki finds out that Akemi Soryuin, a schoolmate of hers, is also thinking about joining. Upon meeting Naruzo Machio, one of the trainers, she falls heads over heels in love with him and joins the gym. Motivated, Hibiki vows to lose weight.

Characters

Main characters

A second-year high school girl who joins Silverman Gym to slim down. Unfortunately, due to a lack of regular exercise and her terrible eating habits, she tends to tire out easily and any progress she does achieve is quickly undone. However, as the series progresses, her condition slowly improves and she is revealed to have a hidden talent for combat sports. She also has a brother who runs a yakiniku restaurant where she sometimes helps out.

 A second-year high school girl who is the student council president at the same school Hibiki attends. She is popular due to being a beautiful girl who excels in sports and academics along with coming from a rich family. She has a muscle fetish and joins the Silverman Gym mostly to satisfy these desires, and often expresses her desire for Hibiki and others to become macho. Unlike Hibiki, she is in much better physical condition. Her character is a reference to the author's previous series, Kengan Ashura, being the younger sister of one of the characters appearing in the series, Shion Soryuin.

 A second-year high school girl who is Hibiki's best friend. Ayaka is a buff who likes watching films with Hibiki. Both she and her sister are daughters of a famous former pro boxer who founded his own gym called the Glory Gym. Because her father taught both of them how to box since their younger days, she is in excellent physical condition and is a capable boxer who coaches for their gym. Her training is such that she can do shadow boxing perfectly and even perform the infamous "Dragon Flag", known for extreme difficulties.

A member of Silverman Gym's Moscow branch. After losing to Hibiki in arm wrestling, she declares herself her rival and moves to Japan, even transferring to Hibiki's school and staying at her house without permission. While not into strength training, she practices sambo and manages to stay fit that way. She tries to maintain an image of a typical Russian stereotype, but is really just an otaku. She was the first person to figure out Satomi's secret cosplaying life. Like Akemi, she is directly related to a character fron Kengan Ashura; namely, she is the niece of minor character Ivan Karaev.

Satomi is the history teacher at Koyo Women's Academy. She is secretly a famous cosplayer who uses the alias Yuria Riko. Upon joining the Silverman Gym, like Hibiki, she also develops a crush on Machio. Gina was the first to figure out Satomi's secret cosplaying life, as she is a fan of Yuria Riko.

A trainer at the Silverman Gym who regularly coaches Hibiki and Akemi. Hibiki develops a crush on him at first sight, which becomes her primary motivation to join the gym. He is a dedicated, kindhearted and polite professional who always earnestly helps and supports Hibiki. Although belying his charming demeanor and handsome profile, Machio is deceptively muscular. While Machio looks no different than a regular young man with his clothes on, he has such a large and well-defined physique that once he flexes his muscles, he reveals a muscle mass so large he literally rips his clothes, which contrasts with his baby face. It is revealed that he was a classmate of Hibiki's brother and Ayaka's sister, and a disciple of Harnold Dogegenchonegger.

Supporting characters

A famous movie star whom Hibiki and Ayaka are huge fans of. He is also Machio's mentor. He is a parody of Arnold Schwarzenegger.

Ayaka's older sister. She works as a boxing coach at the Glory Gym.

Rumika is Hibiki and Ayaka's homeroom teacher. Like Satomi, she is also secretly a cosplayer.

Yakusha is Akemi and Gina's homeroom teacher, who is in excellent physical condition for someone her age and dislikes being referred to as old. Her character is a reference to the author's previous series, Kengan Ashura, hailing from the Kure Clan, a notorious family of assassins, and being the mother of one of the characters appearing in the series, Karua Kure.

A man who works as a director for a TV station.

Harnold Dogegenchonegger's secretary. He is a parody of Jason Statham.

Media

Manga
How Heavy Are the Dumbbells You Lift? is written by Yabako Sandrovich and illustrated by MAAM. The series is set in the same universe as Sandrovich's other work Kengan Ashura. It began serialization on Shogakukan's Ura Sunday website and MangaONE app on August 5, 2016. Shogakukan has compiled its chapters into individual tankōbon volumes. The first volume was published on December 19, 2016. As of December 19, 2022, seventeen volumes have been published. In North America, Seven Seas Entertainment announced the acquisition of the manga for an English release in April 2019. The first volume was published on November 26, 2019.

Volume list

Chapters not yet in tankōbon format

Anime
An anime television series adaptation was announced on January 15, 2019. The series was produced by Doga Kobo and directed by Mitsue Yamazaki, with Fumihiko Shimo handling the series composition, Ai Kikuchi designing the characters, and Yukari Hashimoto composing the music. It aired from July 3 to September 18, 2019 on AT-X, Tokyo MX, KBS, SUN, and other channels. It ran for 12 episodes. The opening theme is  performed by Fairouz Ai and Kaito Ishikawa, while the ending theme is  performed by Ishikawa.

Funimation had licensed the series outside Asia. Following Sony's acquisition of Crunchyroll, the series was moved to Crunchyroll. Medialink holds the license for the series in Southeast Asia.

Episode list

Reception
In 2019, the manga was nominated for the 65th Shogakukan Manga Award for the shōnen category.

Gadget Tsūshin listed lines from the opening theme and the training video in their 2019 anime buzzwords list.

The anime series was nominated for Best Boy for Naruzo Machio and Best Comedy at the 4th Crunchyroll Anime Awards, but lost to Tanjiro Kamado from Demon Slayer: Kimetsu no Yaiba and Kaguya-sama: Love Is War, respectively.

Notes

References

External links
Dumbbell Nan-Kilo Moteru? at Ura Sunday 
  
 

2019 anime television series debuts
Anime series based on manga
AT-X (TV network) original programming
Comedy anime and manga
Crunchyroll anime
Doga Kobo
Japanese webcomics
Medialink
School life in anime and manga
Seven Seas Entertainment titles
Shogakukan manga
Shōnen manga
Slice of life anime and manga
Sports anime and manga
Webcomics in print